Prior to the amendment of Tamil Nadu Entertainments Tax Act 1939 on 22 July 2006, Gross was 115 per cent of Nett for all films. Post-amendment, Gross equalled Nett for films with pure Tamil titles. Commercial Taxes Department disclosed 13.18 crore in entertainment tax revenue for the year. Producer Dhananjayan reports in his publication The Art & Business Of Cinema that the box office generated 525 crore in domestic nett against investment of 650 crore.

The following is a list of films produced in the Tamil cinema in India that released in 2009.

2009 releases
The following is a list of films produced in the Tamil film industry in India, which were released theatrically in 2009. They are presented in order of their release dates..

January-March

April-June

July-September

October-December

Dubbed films

Awards

References 

2009
2009 in Indian cinema
Tamil
2000s Tamil-language films